Dimitra Korokida is a Greek Paralympic athlete. She represented Greece at the 2016 Summer Paralympics in Rio de Janeiro, Brazil and she won the bronze medal in the women's shot put F53 event.

She won the silver medal in the women's javelin throw F52/F53 event at the 2013 World Championships held in Lyon, France. Two years later, she won the gold medal in the women's shot put F53 event at the 2015 World Championships held in Doha, Qatar.

She also competed at the 2016 European Championships held in Grosseto, Italy winning the silver medal in the women's shot put F53/F54 event.

References

External links 
 

Living people
Year of birth missing (living people)
Place of birth missing (living people)
Greek female javelin throwers
Greek female shot putters
Paralympic athletes of Greece
Athletes (track and field) at the 2016 Summer Paralympics
Medalists at the 2016 Summer Paralympics
Paralympic bronze medalists for Greece
Paralympic medalists in athletics (track and field)
Wheelchair shot putters
Wheelchair javelin throwers
Paralympic shot putters
21st-century Greek women